The Ma Wat River is a river in Fanling, northern New Territories, Hong Kong. Its source lies at Kau Lung Hang Shan. The river flows northwards towards Fanling, staying near the eastern industrial areas. It empties into the Ng Tung River near Kan Lung Tsuen.

See also
List of rivers and nullahs in Hong Kong

References
2007. 2007 Hong Kong Map. Easy Finder Ltd.

External links
Rivers of Hong Kong, in Chinese

Rivers of Hong Kong
Fanling